Afzal (also Romanized as Afẕal) is a village in Kandovan Rural District, Kandovan District, Meyaneh County, East Azerbaijan Province, Iran. In the 2006 census, its population was 93, in 20 families.

References 

Populated places in Meyaneh County